KDBI-FM (106.3 MHz) is a radio station broadcasting a Regional Mexican format. Licensed to Homedale, Idaho, United States, the station serves the Boise, Idaho Arbitron market and the Treasure Valley. The station is currently owned by Kevin Terry, through licensee Radio Rancho, LLC, and is the sibling of KPDA (100.7 FM).

History
The station went on the air as KBNH on May 10, 1999. On June 8, 2005, the station changed its call sign to KQTA. KQTA was an affiliate of the Spanish Variety "Juan" format until 5 pm on September 5, 2011.

Bustos Media used to own the station. In September 2010, Bustos transferred most of its licenses to Adelante Media Group as part of a settlement with its lenders.

Adelante Media sold KQTA and KDBI to JLD Media, LLC effective December 31, 2014, at a price of $850,000.

On January 15, 2015, KQTA changed their format to Regional Mexican, branded as "La Gran D 106.3" under new call letters, KDBI.

Effective March 27, 2015, owner Kevin Terry transferred KDBI's license to Radio Rancho, LLC. The station changed its call sign to KDBI-FM on March 10, 2017.

References

External links
La Gran D Boise Facebook

Hispanic and Latino American culture in Idaho
DBI-FM
Radio stations established in 2005
2005 establishments in Idaho